is a traditional Japanese game in which a player scoops goldfish with a paper scooper. It is also called, "Scooping Goldfish", "Dipping for Goldfish", or "Snatching Goldfish". "Kingyo" means goldfish and "sukui" means scooping. Sometimes bouncy balls are used instead of goldfish. Japanese summer festivals or ennichi commonly have a stall for this activity.

Rules

Each person plays individually. The basic rule is that the player scoops goldfish from a pool with a paper scooper called a "poi" and puts them into a bowl with the poi. This game requires care and speed as the poi can tear easily. The game is over when the poi is completely broken or incapable of scooping properly. Even if one part of the poi is torn, the player can continue the game with the remaining part.

At ennichi or summer festival stalls, the game is not a competition. Participation typically costs around 100 yen and players can take the scooped goldfish home in a plastic bag provided by the stall keeper.  The game is unlimited, so players can scoop until their pois are completely broken. If they cannot scoop any goldfish, the stall keeper may be kind enough to give them one or two free goldfish. Each stall usually has its own rules. For example, there are some stalls where players can get a stronger poi if they pay more. Other stalls give players presents if they scoop a lot.  In some variations, there are also medaka (Japanese killifish) that are faster and harder to catch than goldfish.  Usually, for every four goldfish, there is one medaka, so in ennichi, if you catch one, it counts as four goldfish.

At the National Goldfish Scooping Championship, players follow official rules that are different from the rules listed above.

Pool

The poi consists of a round plastic frame with a hand grip, and paper on the frame. The poi paper can break easily when put into water, so players should not move the poi too quickly. In some stalls, staff have unbreakable poi which consist of a net to scoop goldfish instead of paper.

Bowl

Bag
If players get goldfish, they can take them home in bags provided by the stall keeper.

Goldfish
The varieties of goldfish often used in goldfish scooping are "Koaka", "Demekin", and "Anekin".

History
This game started in the late Edo period, around 1810. In those days, pois were made with nets, and it was a game played by children. Pois came to be made with paper and stalls were started in the Taishō period, around 1910.

The game became more and more popular, and the National Goldfish Scooping Championship began in 1995. Today it is so popular that stalls can be found at many ennichi 縁日 "summer festivals" in Japan.

Variants

National Goldfish Scooping Championship
The  is the biggest official competition managed by the National Goldfish Scooping Association and Yamatokōriyama city in Nara Prefecture (Yamatokōriyama is famous for producing goldfish). It is held on the third Saturday and Sunday in August every year. In 2007, the 13th championship was held and 1116 people participated in it. It consisted of three sections:
 Children section: competition by children who are under 15
 General section: competition by people ages 15 and up
 Group section: competition for the sum number of the goldfish scooped by a team of three people

There are area trials and the first and second in every section can participate in National Championship. Extraordinarily in the Nara trials, 60 people in the child section, 80 people in the ordinary section and 40 groups in the group section can participate. The rules are detailed and include the size of goldfish, poi and pool, and the number of umpires. Contestants compete for the number of goldfish scooped in three minutes. If the paper of poi is completely broken, the game is over and the score is the number of goldfish scooped until then.

In the tenth championship (2004) a player scooped 61 goldfish in three minutes in the semifinal, a new high and averaging one goldfish per three seconds.

In 2011, 2,400 players competed. The team title went to 3 players who scooped 173 goldfish.

Notes and references

External links

 National Championship of Goldfish Scooping(in Japanese)
 Technique of Goldfish Scooping(in Japanese)

Japanese popular culture
Japanese games
Articles containing video clips